Samuel Alegada (born 4 August 1962) is a Filipino weightlifter. He competed in the men's bantamweight event at the 1988 Summer Olympics. Alegada later became a coach for the weightlifting national team of the Philippines.

He was also the holder of men's 56kg Philippine national record which he set by lifting 115 kilograms at the 1991 Southeast Asian Games in Manila until it was broken by Nestor Colonia's 116 kilogram-lift at the 2011 Philippine National Games in Bacolod.

References

External links

1962 births
Living people
Filipino male weightlifters
Olympic weightlifters of the Philippines
Weightlifters at the 1988 Summer Olympics
Place of birth missing (living people)
20th-century Filipino people